Scott Davis and Ben Testerman were the defending champions, but did not participate this year.

Mike De Palmer and Peter Doohan won the title, defeating Eddie Edwards and Danie Visser 6–3, 6–4 in the final.

Seeds

  Paul Annacone /  Christo van Rensburg (first round)
  Steve Denton /  David Dowlen (first round)
  Mike De Palmer /  Peter Doohan (champions)
  Eddie Edwards /  Danie Visser (final)

Draw

Draw

External links
 Draw

1985 Livingston Open
1985 Grand Prix (tennis)